Big Brother 14 is the fourteenth season of various versions of Big Brother and may refer to:

Big Brother 14 (U.S.), the 2012 edition of the American version of Big Brother
Gran Hermano 14 (Spain), the 2013 edition of the Spanish version of Big Brother
Big Brother 14 (UK), the 2013 edition of the UK version of Big Brother
Big Brother Brasil 14, the 2014 edition of the Brazilian version of Big Brother

See also
 Big Brother (franchise)
 Big Brother (disambiguation)